Jihan Zencirli (born July 6, 1985) is a Turkish-American conceptual and sculpture artist in Los Angeles and New York. Zencirli, who is credited under the artist moniker GERONIMO, has been noted by  The New York Times to create “arguably the most recognizable public art installations in the country.”

Career

Since 2010, Zencirli has been historically referred to as "Mother" or founder of a popular industry of balloon design and is known for her large public art sculptures.

Zencirli is the owner of the companies Geronimo Balloons and Fondazione Geronimo. The latter is notably a departure from balloons. Since 2018, Zencirli has focused on semi-permanent sculpture, digital and performance art.

In 2010, Zencirli began experimenting with large, metre-wide balloons she had left over from a work project at her job for a children's character educational company. After delivering one of the balloons to a friend's birthday dinner, she began to receive requests from strangers to recreate the floating balloon sculpture.

In 2011, Zencirli moved from her hometown of Seattle, Washington to Los Angeles, California which led to her founding Geronimo Balloons. Since 2011, Zencirli and her designs have been featured in commercial ad campaigns including GM, Google, General Electric, AirBnb, Square, Inc., T-Mobile, Squarespace and Tampax as well as the 2019 music video and stage performances of American pop group, the Jonas Brothers. Zencirli has been a contributing designer to many Hollywood televisions shows, including the HBO mini series Big Little Lies.

In 2016, Zencirli was commissioned by The Broad museum in downtown Los Angeles for their one year anniversary. The temporary installation consisting of thousands of balloons could be seen on the front of the building in celebration.

Also in 2016 Zencirli was featured in Oprah Magazine, In Style and on Gwyneth Paltrow's lifestyle blog, Goop.com. Paltrow listed Zencirli as one of her favorite artists. That same year she appeared in a 2017 Cadillac campaign called, "Dare Greatly", along with furniture designer Stephen Kenn.

In 2017, Zencirli received the Edge award at the L.A. Design Festival for her significant contribution to the L.A.'s Design Culture.

Beginning January 2018, Zencirli was invited by New York City Ballet to create signature installations for their sixth annual Art Series. As the first female collaborator selected, Zencirli inflated more than 200,000 compostable, biodegradable balloons ranging in size from ten inches to ten feet, in a series of installations and collaborative choreography at the Ballet’s home at Lincoln Center. Previous years' artists included french political artist JR, Dustin Yellin and Marcel Dzama.

In March 2018, The NGV Triennial and Melbourne Design Week hosted multiple works by Zencirli as part of a city-wide arts initiative.

In September 2018, Zencirli created a 4 day multi-sensory installation for London Design Festival in Shoreditch London.

In 2018, Zencirli was commissioned as the first artist to create a temporary exhibit atop the edifice of the David & Gladys Wright House in Phoenix Arizona, the pre-curser of cantilevered architecture to The Guggenheim Museum. The exhibit honored the transition from private ownership to donation to the School of Architecture at Taliesin West, formerly known as the Frank Lloyd Wright School of Architecture.

In June 2018, Zencirli, who has said that her work "is about looking up and getting out of yourself for a moment", debuted a six month sculpture residency on Pier 17 on the South Street Seaport suspended over the East River in Lower Manhattan.

In July 2019, on London's Greenwich Peninsula, along the Thames River path, an elevated walkway designed by Diller Scofidio + Renfro, Zencirli installed 25 sculptures along the route, with additional sculptures by British artists Damien Hirst and Allen Jones and Antony Gormley's Quantum Cloud. Yoko Ono's Wish Tree installation coincided as companion to the opening of Zencirli's sculptures.

As of 2021, Zencirli has been working with Rockefeller Center and Creative Director, Jenna Lyons, to design a series of site specific sculptures on the Plaza and Top of Rock Observatory.

Collaborations 
Zencirli has collaborated with other artists and designers, including furniture empire West Elm and furniture designer Stephen Kenn.
Zencirli has installed her balloon designs in public spaces around the world, including India and Europe.
Zencirli also founded a group called "Nefarious Frillers", who covertly sets up public balloon installations all around Los Angeles.
In 2020, Zencirli is slated to release a collaboration with the Italian Fashion House Versace, to debut at Salone del Mobile.

Exhibition and Performance

 "Notes to Self"- Conception Installation - The Standard Hotel, Los Angeles, CA
1 Year Anniversary of The Broad Museum- Public Balloon Installation - The Broad, Downtown Los Angeles, September 2016
Oh Happy Day 10th Anniversary - Temporary 5,000 Balloon Art Installation -  Oh Happy Day offices, Los Angeles, November 2016
NYC Pride celebration  - 15,000 rainbow-colored balloons Art Installation, New York.
In 2017, Zencirli published the book, "My Grandfather is the Yogurt Bomber" as immersive theatre to a live audience at CBS Studio. Contributors to the show included artist James Jean and comedian Ramy Youssef.

Personal life 
Zencirli is twentieth generation Sufi, from the town of her surname, Zencirli, in Konya Province of Turkey, burial place of Rumi.

In Los Angeles, Zencirli owns the mixed-arts studio of Memphis Group founding member, Peter Shire.

In the News
In January 2019, Zencirli was reported to have an estimated net worth of $10,000,000, making her one of the highest earning female artists in the United States.

In June 2016, musician Father John Misty claimed to steal a rose quartz crystal from a Moon Juice shop in Los Angeles. A 1.5 metre papier mache replica crystal appeared on the top of a building in L.A., thanking Father John “4 Freeing Me”. According to a photo Misty released, "she’s free and loving life". It was revealed in a 2018 interview with New York Magazine, that it was Zencirli who had fabricated the sculpture and placed it on the roof of her Echo Park studio.

On June 24, 2019, model Irina Shayk made her first public appearance after the announcement of her split from actor Bradley Cooper, to support Turkish-American conceptual and media artist GERONIMO, Jihan Zencirli, at Madison Square Park for the opening of her collaboration with luxury jewelry designer David Yurman.

References

External links
Geronimo Website

1985 births
Living people
American contemporary artists
American women artists
Turkish artists
American people of Turkish descent
21st-century American women
Balloon artists